Angraecopsis gracillima is an epiphytic species of plant in family Orchidaceae. It is found in Kenya, Uganda, and eastern Congo at altitudes from 4,000-7,000 feet above sea level. The flowers are white with a yellow center and have a 4 cm long green spur.

References 

gracillima
Orchids of Kenya
Flora of Uganda
Flora of the Democratic Republic of the Congo